Kuttur is a small village in Somwarpet Taluk in Kodagu District of Karnataka State, India. It comes under Shanivarsanthe Hobli. It belongs to Mysore Division. It is located 12 km towards east from District headquarters Madikeri. 28 km from Somvarpet, 162 km from Mangalore and 234 km from State capital Bangalore.

Shanivarsanthe, Madikeri and Somwarpet are the nearby towns to Kuttur.

People from Kuttur
 Kuttur Mallappa, former Minister for Home and MLA for Shanivarsanthe of Coorg (Kodagu) and later went on to become MLA Mercara of Mysore State

See also
 Somwarpet
 Shanivarsanthe
 Kodagu
 Districts of Karnataka

References

External links
 http://Kodagu.nic.in/

Villages in Kodagu district